Scutiger brevipes is a species of amphibian in the family Megophryidae. It is endemic to China as it is only known from its type locality in Dawu County, Sichuan. It is sometimes considered to be a synonym of Scutiger glandulatus. Its lives in small forest streams and in spring-fed alpine streams.

References

brevipes
Endemic fauna of Sichuan
Amphibians of China
Amphibians described in 1950
Taxonomy articles created by Polbot